Licancabur is a stratovolcano on the border between Bolivia and Chile, south of the Sairecabur volcano and west of Juriques. Part of the Andean Central Volcanic Zone, it has a prominent, -high cone. A  summit crater containing Licancabur Lake, a crater lake which is among the highest lakes in the world, caps the volcano. Three stages of lava flows emanate from the edifice.

Licancabur formed atop of Pleistocene ignimbrites and has been active during the Holocene, after the ice ages. Although no historic eruptions of the volcano are known, lava flows extending into Laguna Verde have been dated to 13,240 ± 100 BP. The volcano has primarily erupted andesite, with small amounts of dacite and basaltic andesite.

Its climate is cold, dry and very sunny, with high levels of ultraviolet radiation. Licancabur is not covered by glaciers. Cushion plants and shrubs form the vegetation lower on its slopes. Chinchillas were formerly hunted on the volcano.

Licancabur is considered a holy mountain by the Atacameno people, which consider it a relative of Cerro Quimal mountain in northern Chile. Archeological sites have been found on its slopes and in the summit crater, which was possibly a prehistoric watchtower.

Name
It is also known as "Volcan de Atacama" and "Licancaur". The border between Bolivia and Chile, defined by the 1904 Treaty of Peace and Friendship, crosses the volcano.

Geography and geology

General setting 
Off the western coast of South America, the Nazca Plate subducts into the Peru-Chile Trench beneath the South American Plate. The Andean Volcanic Belt consists of three main volcanic zones: the Northern Volcanic Zone (from 2° N to 5° S), the Central Volcanic Zone (16° to 28° S) and the Southern Volcanic Zone (33° to 46° S). These volcanic zones are separated by gaps without volcanic activity, where the subducting plate is shallower. These shallower zones have been attributed to the high speed of the plate collision, the young age of the subducting oceanic lithosphere and the curvature of the subducting plate. The most plausible theory is that variations in buoyancy of a subducting plate creates a flat subduction zone. The Cocos, Juan Fernandez and Nazca Ridges are associated with such volcanic gaps where they collide with the oceanic trench. The subduction of spreading ridges can also diminish volcanism, as observed at the Chile Rise further south. The buoyancy of these crustal structures may hinder subduction, reducing water supply to the mantle and inducing the formation of melts.

Not all volcanism in Chile is relative to subduction of the Nazca Plate; the Chile Ridge exhibits submarine volcanism, and volcanism in the Austral Volcanic Zone is triggered by the Antarctic Plate subducting beneath the South American Plate. , one hundred ninety-eight South American volcanoes were on the Global Volcanism Program's list of volcanoes with Holocene activity.

Local setting 
Licancabur is part of the Central Volcanic Zone and is situated at the western edge of the Altiplano. Among the active volcanoes of the region are Putana (erupted at the end of the 19th century), Llullaillaco (1868) and Lascar (1993). Other stratovolcanoes are Tacora, Nevados de Payachata, Isluga, Tata Sabaya, Ollague, Tocorpuri, Sairecabur and Socompa. The Central Volcanic Zone has more than 1,100 volcanic centres—many older than the Pleistocene, since the area's prevailing arid climate prevented substantial erosion. During the Miocene, the area around Licancabur was the site of major ignimbrite-forming eruptions. Llano de Chajnantor (southeast of Licancabur) is the site of several observatories, including the Llano de Chajnantor Observatory.

Licancabur is a -high symmetrical cone. Some old lava flows reach Laguna Verde, and -long pyroclastic flow deposits have been found. There are no glacial cirques on the volcano. The volcano's eastern and western flanks have distinct appearances, since it formed on a basement which dips towards the Salar de Atacama.

Crater and lake 

The top of the mountain features a -wide crater which contains an elliptical lake. Fed by snowfall, it is one of the highest lakes in the world. Based on its relative lack of salt deposits, in 1955 researchers postulated that the lake spilled through a  notch in the crater's southwestern rim when the climate was wetter. Excess water now leaves through seepage, keeping salt levels low. There are other lakes (usually frozen) at similar altitudes in the Andes.

Neighbouring volcanoes 
East of Licancabur is its companion volcano, Juriques. West–east alignments of volcanoes like Licancabur and Juriques are common in the region, due to tectonic influences. Araral, Cerro Cabana, Cerro Canapa, Cerros de Tocorpuri, Cerro Linzor, Inacaliri, Inca, Jardin, Putana, Volcan Tatio and Zapaleri are other volcanoes in the neighbourhood of Licancabur.  southeast, volcanoes continue with Tocol, the Purico Complex and the -high Llullaillaco. Volcanoes in the Puna de Atacama formed during the Pliocene on Tertiary dacitic, liparitic and rhyolitic ignimbrites. These rocks have a light colour, due to the rhyolite. Licancabur grew over the 1.35-million-year-old Purico, the La Pacana and 1.09±0.56-million-year-old Chaxas ignimbrites.

Composition 
Licancabur has erupted primarily andesite, but basaltic andesite and dacite have also been found. The rocks are dark and grey-coloured. Basaltic andesite is present in the older lavas, and dacite in the more-recent ones. Although the rocks have a seriate texture, the groundmass is hyalopilitic. Phenocrysts include amphibole, clinopyroxene, hornblende, orthopyroxene, plagioclase and titanomagnetite; olivine is found in andesite, and biotite in dacites. Plagioclase is the most common. The amount of phenocrysts in Licancabur's rocks is smaller than that in other Central Volcanic Zone volcanoes, such as Lascar.

They contain glass, microliths and phenocrysts, and have a composition similar to phenocrysts. The clots probably formed from the aggregation of phenocrysts and their subsequent growth; some phenocrysts in the rocks formed when the clots broke apart.

Isotope ratios are typical of Central Volcanic Zone volcanoes. There are differences in the elemental composition of andesites and dacites, with the latter resembling adakites more than the former. Antisana (in the Northern Volcanic Zone) and El Negrillar (in the Central Volcanic Zone) are two other volcanoes which have erupted adakites or adakite-like lavas.

Based on its composition, it is assumed that the magma at Licancabur formed from the partial melting of the oceanic crust subducted at the Peru-Chile Trench after metamorphosis. This magma melted part of the mantle wedge above the subducting plate, mixing with the melt products. Further contamination by crustal Tonalite-Trondhjemite-Granodiorite-like rocks from the Archean, crystal fractionation and magma mixing further up in the crust then yielded the Licancabur magmas. The younger lavas may have formed from the mixing of dacite with the magmas forming the older lavas. Some inclusions in Licancabur rocks seem to have originated as wall rocks of the magma chamber.

Xenoliths containing gabbro are also found. Unlike neighbouring volcanoes, such as Saciel at Sairecabur (further north) and Tocol (further south), there appear to be no sulfur deposits on Licancabur.

Climate and ecosystem 

The region's climate has been dry since the Tertiary. The area around Licancabur is dominated by year-round high pressure caused by the South Pacific High, giving it a very sunny climate. Because of the lack of moisture, the energy from solar radiation is dissipated primarily by wind. In the Llano de Chajnantor area, wind generally reaches its maximum strength during the day. Its prevailing direction is from the west, except in summer when winds are more variable. Because of the area's tropical location (where the ozone layer is thinner) and high altitude, it receives a large amount of ultraviolet (UV) radiation. The world's highest level of UV radiation (UV index of 43.3>) was reported from Licancabur, although the high irradiation might have caused measurement artifacts.

According to observers in 1955, temperatures at the Licancabur summit were always below freezing, sometimes falling below .

Snow has been recorded at Llano de Chajnantor when in summer easterly winds transport moisture from the Amazon to the area. Licancabur has no persistent snowpack; snow deposited by storms usually disappears within a few days. In sheltered areas, however, it can persist for months, and a 1985 map shows a persistent snow/ice cover at the summit. The elevation of the snow line at Licancabur is estimated to be .

Licancabur is part of the Eduardo Avaroa Andean Fauna National Reserve. Vegetation at lower altitudes is typical of a high tropical desert climate. In oases and river valleys of the depression between the pre-Cordillera and the Andes, shrubs such as Atriplex grow; however, the surrounding Atacama Desert is mostly devoid of plant life.

At higher altitudes, meltwater from snow supports more life on Licancabur than on similar mountains. Life further down the mountain could be supported by the fertilizing effect of dust from volcanic rocks. Polylepis incana might have been more prevalent at Licancabur during wetter times, and is now more common in Bolivia. The upper parts of the mountain had been avoided by hunters, and after some attempts at high elevations during the 1920s chinchilla hunting disappeared from the area.

Eruptive history 
Licancabur formed as three units, all of which feature lava flows; the last one also includes pyroclastic deposits. The bulk of the cone was formed by the second unit. The emplacement of the second unit was preceded by the injection of basic magma into the magma chamber. The oldest flows crop out on the western and northern sides of the volcano and are partially covered by more-recent flows from Licancabur and flows from Sairecabur. The neighbouring Juriques dates to the Pleistocene. Flows from both volcanoes appear to be pre-glacial. The older lavas have compositions similar to shoshonite and to old Sairecabur lavas, and tend to be more basic than recent lavas. Weak explosive activity left pyroclastic deposits on the volcano. 
Licancabur formed primarily after the late glacial period, between 12,000 and 10,000 years ago. Flank lava flows are its youngest feature: They were not affected by glaciation, and some have levees and ridges. Lava flows reaching Laguna Verde have been radiocarbon dated to 13,240 ± 100 BP, and 13,270 ± 100 years old lacustrine sediments have been buried by flows. The volcano has not erupted during recorded history, and the state of Inca ruins indicates that eruptions during the last millennium are improbable, Bubbling and water temperatures of  have been observed in the crater lake of Licancabur, which may remain liquid due to geothermal heating. Renewed activity would most likely consist of the emission of lava and pyroclastic flows either from the crater or the flanks.

Human settlement 

Despite being lower than many neighbouring mountains, Licancabur stands out from other volcanoes in the region and is well-known. The Atacameno people worshiped it, and other high mountains are still considered sacred. Licancabur was considered divine, and attempts to climb it were discouraged and sometimes met by force; climbing it supposedly brought misfortune.

The volcano is the mate of Quimal in the Cordillera Domeyko; at the solstices, the mountains overshadow one another. According to local myth, this copulation fertilizes the earth. Another legend mentions that a legless Inka king lived on Licancabur's summit; he was carried around in a litter and sometimes the carriers died from exhaustion and were buried with treasures. There is a story about Inkas hiding gold and silver in the crater lake; the wares disappeared and supposedly turned the lake bitter and emerald-green. Licancabur is considered "male" and a mountain of fire, in contrast to San Pedro (considered a mountain of water). According to legend, a golden object (most commonly a guanaco) was offered as tribute in the summit crater; human sacrifices have been reported on the volcano. Between 1,500 and 1,000 years ago, people were buried in San Pedro de Atacama in a posture facing the volcano and the Pukará de Quitor fortress in Chile is also oriented towards the mountain.

In 1953, climbers found three buildings on one side on Licancabur. They were built in the pirca style, where stones are fitted together without mortar. A woodpile was found between two of the buildings, which were described as two dwellings and a fireplace. There is a ceremonial platform on the top of Licancabur. Wood was also scattered around its crater. With the summit's panoramic view, which includes Calama and pass routes from Argentina, Licancabur may have been a watchtower for the Atacamenos. Its watchtower function may have been coordinated with fortresses in the area such as Lasana, Turi and a settlement identified in 1955 at Quebrada de Chaxas (northwest of the volcano). The settlement at Licancabur had a central courtyard, surrounded by buildings, and ceramics found there resemble these of Pukará de Quitor and Toconao Oriente. A tambo reportedly existed at the volcano, and its construction is indicative of the influence the Inca state had over the region.

Other archeological findings on Andean mountains were made on Acamarachi and Pular (where ceremonial platforms were found), Cerro Colorado, Juriques, Llullaillaco, Miniques and Quimal. Sites had pirca structures and firewood, and some may have been part of a signaling system. Many were in use during the Inca civilization, and on Quimal artifacts correlative to the Spanish period have been found. Aconcagua, Coropuna, Chachani, El Plomo, El Toro, Llullaillaco, Mercedario and Picchu Picchu are other mountains with Inca sanctuaries.

The area around Licancabur was first settled by the Atacameno people, presumably because of the water in local canyons. The Incas, under Yawar Waqaq, were followed by the Spanish during the early 16th century in the region; both were looking for yareta and chinchillas.

Climbing 
Unlike neighbouring mountains, Licancabur is difficult to climb; its upper part slopes steeply, and the ground is loose and prone to landslides. Some of the instability may be due to earthquakes, snow, wind or geothermal effects (resulting in thermal stress), and it frustrated an attempt of an engineer at Chuquicamata to climb the mountain in the 1920s. Ascent from the Bolivian side takes six hours plus half that time for the descent and requires caution during winter, although the mountain can be climbed during any month. Rumours about a "staircase", later probably obliterated by landslides and rockfalls, were reported in 1955. The first recorded ascent of the volcano was in 1884 by Severo Titicocha, who was accompanied by Juan Santelices (a delegate of the Chilean government) in an 1886 ascent. Landmines have been reported from the Chilean side.

See also
 List of volcanoes in Bolivia
 List of volcanoes in Chile
 List of Andean peaks with known pre-Columbian ascents

Notes

References

Sources

General sources 
 
 
NASA Licancabur Expedition: Exploring the Highest Lakes on Earth

External links 

 Licancabur, tour 2003
 Lake Licancabur
 Licancabur, cerca de Marte – Mercuria Calama article – (In Spanish).

Volcanoes of Antofagasta Region
Volcanoes of Potosí Department
Andean Volcanic Belt
Stratovolcanoes of Bolivia
Stratovolcanoes of Chile
Subduction volcanoes
Bolivia–Chile border
International mountains of South America
Mountains of Chile
Volcanic crater lakes
Polygenetic volcanoes
Holocene stratovolcanoes
Quaternary South America
Five-thousanders of the Andes